Kislőd is a village in Veszprém county, Hungary.

Gallery

External links 
 Official Website of Kislőd (in Hungarian)
 Street map (Hungarian)

Populated places in Veszprém County